The Archdiocese of Trnava is a Latin Catholic archdiocese in western Slovakia including bigger part of the Trnava, and parts of Nitra and Trenčín regions. It has its seat in Trnava. Although it is an archdiocese, it is not a metropolitan and is instead a suffragan of Bratislava. In 2013 Pope Francis appointed Auxiliary Bishop Ján Orosch as the next Archbishop of the Archdiocese of Trnava.

History
The diocese was first created as Apostolic Administration of Trnava on 29 May 1922, subordinate to the Holy See, on the territory of Archdiocese of Esztergom which became part of the Czechoslovakia after 1918. On the order of Pope Paul VI on 30 December 1977, it was elevated to the status of metropolitan archdiocese and renamed to the Archdiocese of Trnava, and it had at first suffragans of Nitra, Banská Bystrica, Rožňava, Košice and Spiš. On 31 March 1995, the archdiocese was renamed to Archdiocese of Bratislava-Trnava, and since then it had only suffragans of Banská Bystrica and Nitra.  Its territory covered Bratislava, Trnava, Nitra (except the city of Nitra and the strip connecting it with the main part of the Diocese of Nitra), small part of the Trenčín and south-western part of the Banská Bystrica regions. As of 2004, it covered an area of approximately 14,000 km² with a population of 1,930,000 people of which around 70% were of Catholic faith.

On 14 February 2008, the archdiocese was split between several dioceses. Trnava became seat of the newly created Archdiocese of Trnava, which, despite being an archdiocese, belongs to the ecclesiastical province of Bratislava as its suffragan.  Other parts of the former diocese have been split between the dioceses of Nitra and Banská Bystrica (see e.g. this map (in Slovak).

Róbert Bezák, C.SS.R. (a member of the Redemptorist order) served as Archbishop from 2009.  In January 2012, the Vatican had named the Czech bishop Jan Baxant as its apostolic visitor to the archdiocese of Trnava. Archbishop Bezák's removal from this see was announced 2 July 2012.

Bishops

Ján Sokol (Archbishop: 14 Feb 2008 - 18 Apr 2009)
Róbert Bezák  (Archbishop: 18 Apr 2009 - 2 Jul 2012)
Ján Orosch (Auxiliary Bishop: 14 Feb 2008, Apostolic Administrator: 2 Jul 2012, Archbishop: 11 Jul 2013 -)

References

External links
 Archdiocese of Bratislava-Trnava 

Catholic Church in Slovakia
Roman Catholic dioceses in Slovakia
Trnava